Oneida is an unincorporated community in Oneida Township, Delaware County, Iowa, United States.

History
 Oneida's population was 27 in 1902, and 127 in 1925. 

Oneida was incorporated until 1994.

References

Unincorporated communities in Delaware County, Iowa
Unincorporated communities in Iowa